Bardeh Kish (also Romanized as Bardeh Kīsh; also known as Bardeh Kesh and Bardkīsh) is a village in Dul Rural District, in the Central District of Urmia County, West Azerbaijan Province, Iran. At the 2006 census, its population was 159, in 35 families.

References 

Populated places in Urmia County